Ruben Mares (born 19 May 1956) is a Filipino boxer. He competed in the men's featherweight event at the 1976 Summer Olympics. At the 1976 Summer Olympics, he lost to Richard Nowakowski of East Germany.

References

External links
 

1956 births
Living people
Filipino male boxers
Olympic boxers of the Philippines
Boxers at the 1976 Summer Olympics
Place of birth missing (living people)
Asian Games medalists in boxing
Boxers at the 1974 Asian Games
Boxers at the 1978 Asian Games
Asian Games silver medalists for the Philippines
Medalists at the 1978 Asian Games
Southeast Asian Games medalists in boxing
Featherweight boxers